The clanwilliam rock-catfish (Austroglanis gilli) is a species of catfish in the family Austroglanididae. It is endemic to South Africa.

Sources

Austroglanis
Freshwater fish of South Africa
Taxonomy articles created by Polbot